José Alexander Medina (born April 21, 1970) is a retired male weightlifter from Venezuela. He competed for his native South American country at the 1992 Summer Olympics in Barcelona, Spain.

References
sports-reference

1970 births
Living people
Venezuelan male weightlifters
Weightlifters at the 1991 Pan American Games
Weightlifters at the 1992 Summer Olympics
Olympic weightlifters of Venezuela
Pan American Games bronze medalists for Venezuela
Pan American Games medalists in weightlifting
Medalists at the 1991 Pan American Games
20th-century Venezuelan people
21st-century Venezuelan people